The Bat Khan Mountain (lit. "firm khan mountain") is a mountain in the Erdenesant, Töv Province in Mongolia. It has an elevation of  2,178 m (7,146 ft). The mountain is a regional sacred mountain in Mongolia.

References

Mountains of Mongolia
Töv Province
Two-thousanders of Mongolia